Wheelchair tennis first entered the Summer Paralympic Games in 1988 as a demonstration sport and as a full medal sport at the 1992 Barcelona Games. Australia has competed at every Paralympic wheelchair tennis competition. There are two categories of medals - open division and quad division.

Notable Australian performances:
 Dylan Alcott won three gold and one silver medal at the 2016 Rio Paralympics and 2020 Tokyo Paralympics. 
 David Hall has won six medals (1 gold medal, 3 silver medals and 2 bronze medals at three Games - 1996 to 2004.
 Daniela Di Toro at the London Games competed at her fifth Games (1996–2012). She won a silver medal in the women's doubles at the Sydney Games

Medal table

Summer Paralympic Games

1988 Seoul

Australia represented by: 
Men – Michael Connell 

Wheelchair tennis was a demonstration sport. Michael Connell won a silver medal in the men's singles.

1992 Barcelona

Australia represented by: 
Men -  Michael Connell, David Hall 
Women – Randa Hinson,  Sue Twelftree 

Australia didn't receive any medals.

1996 Atlanta

Australia represented by: 
Men – Mick Connell,  David Hall 
Women -  Daniela Di Toro, Randa Hinson 
Coach - Greg Crump  

Australia won 1 silver medal and 1 bronze medal.

2000 Sydney

Australia represented in wheelchair tennis by: 
Men -  David Hall, David Johnson  
Women – Daniela Di Toro, Branka Pupovac 
Coach -  Greg Crump (Head) 

Australia had competitive results making three finals out of four and winning 1 gold and 2 silver medals. David Hall took one gold and one silver medal.

2004 Athens

Australia represented in wheelchair tennis: 
Men – Anthony Bonaccurso, David Hall, Ben Weekes   
Women – Daniela Di Toro 
Head coach- Greg Crump 
Officials - Manager – Sallee Trewin  
Australia won 2 silver and 2 bronze medals. 

Detailed Australian Results

2008 Beijing

Representing Australia in wheelchair tennis:  
Men - Michael Dobbie, Ben Weekes  
Women - Daniela Di Toro  
Coach - Head Coach - Greg Crump 
Officilas - Section Manager – Geoff Quinlan 
Daniela Di Toro competed at her fourth Games. Australia did not win a medal as only Michael Dobbie progressed past the first round.
Detailed Australian Results

2012 London

Men  -  Ben Weekes, Adam Kellerman 
Women -  Daniela Di Toro, Janel Manns 
Coaches – Greg Crump (Head), Craig Purcell 
Officials - Section Manager – Brenda Tierney;  

Daniela Di Toro competed at her fifth Games. Australia did not win any medals.

Detailed Australian Results

2016 Rio

Men  -  Dylan Alcott, Heath Davidson (d), Ben Weekes, Adam Kellerman
Women -  Sarah Calati (d)
Coaches - Vernon Cheung (Men's), Franscois Vogelsberger (Quad) 
Officials Team Leader - Brenda Tierney     
Australia achieved impressive results winning two gold medals, Dylan Alcott taking the men's singles and men's quad doubles with Heath Davidson. 

Detailed Australian Results

2020 Tokyo 

Men  -  Dylan Alcott, Heath Davidson, Martyn Dunn (d) Ben Weekes
Coaches-  Jessica Moore  (Men's), Franscois Vogelsberger (Quad)  
Officials - Team Leader - Brenda Tierney   
Australia achieved impressive results winning one gold and one silver medals, Dylan Alcott taking gold the men's quad singles and teaming with Heath Davidson to win silver medal in the men's quad doubles.  

Detailed Australian Results

(d) Paralympic Games debut

See also
 List of Australian Paralympic wheelchair tennis medalists
 Wheelchair tennis at the Summer Paralympics
 Australia at the Paralympics

References

Wheelchair tennis
Australian Paralympic teams
Sports teams in Australia